The Enchanted Princess (German:Die verwunschene Prinzessin) is a 1919 German silent film directed by Erik Lund.

Cast
In alphabetical order
 Ernst Behmer 
 Olga Dalzell 
 Olga Engl 
 Eva May 
 Johannes Riemann 
 Leopold von Ledebur 
 Anna von Palen 
 Emmy Wyda

References

Bibliography
 Hans-Michael Bock and Tim Bergfelder. The Concise Cinegraph: An Encyclopedia of German Cinema. Berghahn Books.

External links

1919 films
Films of the Weimar Republic
German silent feature films
Films directed by Erik Lund
German black-and-white films
1910s German films